Elizabeth Smart: Autobiography is a 2017 American documentary series about Elizabeth Smart, with her family and law-enforcement officials discussing her 2002 kidnapping and the efforts made to find her. The two-hours, two-part documentary special premiered on November 12, 2017.

References 

American documentary television films
A&E (TV network) original programming
Biographical documentary films
2017 documentary films
2017 television films